Sambou Sissoko (born 29 June 2000) is a Malian football player. He plays for Serbian club Čukarički on loan from the Belgian club Kortrijk.

Club career
On 5 October 2020, he signed a two-year contract with Kortrijk in Belgium. Due to visa complications, he did not arrive to the club until two months later.

He made his Belgian First Division A debut for Kortrijk on 23 January 2021 in a game against Cercle Brugge.

On 15 September 2022, Sissoko joined Čukarički in Serbia on loan.

International career
He represented Mali at the 2019 Africa U-20 Cup of Nations, which they won, and the 2019 FIFA U-20 World Cup, where Mali reached the quarterfinals. He scored the decisive goal in the penalty shoot-out to eliminate Argentina in the Round of 16.

References

External links
 

2000 births
21st-century Malian people
Living people
Malian footballers
Mali under-20 international footballers
Association football midfielders
Djoliba AC players
K.V. Kortrijk players
FK Čukarički players
Malian Première Division players
Belgian Pro League players
Serbian SuperLiga players
Malian expatriate footballers
Expatriate footballers in Belgium
Malian expatriate sportspeople in Belgium
Expatriate footballers in Serbia
Malian expatriate sportspeople in Serbia